Sanjha (Origin-) is a Pakistani drama series began to telecast on Hum TV from 17 November 2011. It was written by Samira Fazal and directed  Farooq Rind. Focuses on women trafficking, it has Suhaee Abro in the title role of Sanjha who comes to the Karachi city from the Thar Desert and is constrained to work in a brothel; the kotha.

Plot summary
The story revolves around a poor girl Sanjha from the Thar desert in Sindh province of Pakistan. Bakshu, husband of his sister, sells her to a brothel owner Mumtaz and tells his wife, Sarah, that he has sent Sanjha away to the city to earn a living. In her innocence, Sanjha does not realize that she has not been hired as a maid but as a prostitute. Shabo also lives in the brothel with her two sons, Waheed "Weeda" Murad and Deema. Weeda has a passion for painting and starts liking Sanjha.

Things begin to look up for Sanjha's future when Shabana, who runs an NGO and is writing a book on women visits the brothel with her son, Dr. Ammar, and is approached for help by Sanja's sister, Sarah who is looking for Sanjha. Now story moves on to Mumtaz's brothel where Sanjha is hired and she is renamed as Reshmi. Shabana visits the brothel to write a book on the life of courtesans. But Mumtaz, in a cold-blooded manner denies but agrees on a conditions that Shabana would not take photos nor would ask about their past. Meanwhile Sanjha befriends other girls in the brothel. Mumtaz thinks Sanjha is a lucky charm for her and her brothel. Love blossoms between Sanjha and Murad. Mooda, one of the Mumtaz's dealer, wants to sell Sanjha to another place albeit the wrath of Mumtaz. Sarah learns that she had been sold to a brothel from the woman took Sanjah from the village. Shabana and Ammar tries hard to find Sanjha. Meanwhile, Mumtaz arranges a function for her admirers. Mooda sends of his men to take Sanjha but in turn Rosie another prostitute turns up which enrages Mooda. Mooda brutally murders her. Sanjha performs on that event where Seth Sugarwala was a chief guest and old lover of Mumtaz. Sugarwala now wants to buy Sanjha because of her innocence and her dance. Ammar plans to raid the event but Murad in a fit of jealousy betrays Ammar and tells everything to Mumtaz. Mumtaz and other mates runs away that night. Now Sarah, heartbroken loses hope but Ammar convinces her. Ammar and Murad involves in a verbal fight because of Ammar's love towards Sanjha. Murad stops because Ammar helped his ailing mother. Murad threats Mumtaz to kill her on grounds of Sanjha's releasing matter. This enrages Mumtaz and she sells Sanjha to Sugarwala. Sarah, now hopeless commits suicide by the immense shock by the news. Sanjha soon becomes a mistress of Sugarwala. Now story moves on to Weeda who is heartbroken and bearing the pain of selling Sanjha. His college mate Narmeen falls hard for him but Weeda dislikes her. After seeing his paintings she encourages Weeda to show the painting on an exhibition. Weeda accepts and a man likes his painting so much that he keeps Weeda as a painting artist. Man is none other than the hukum. Sanjha angrily confronts Weeda when she see him. She curses him countlessly and beats him with a stick. Hukum's aide Laeeq tries to make understand Sanjha about Weeda but she backfires him. Now Weeda's lover wants him to marry her. Weeda clarifies that he doesn't love her and leave him for God sake. Weeda takes help of Laeeq to give letter to his lover about his dark past. This leads to end of the relationship of both. Hukum learns of the Weeda and Sanjha's earlier affair and angrily shouts at her but Sanjha clarifies that she do not love him. Now to make Weeda jealous and to taunt him, she keeps proposal to hukum to marry her and hukum and Sanjha goes for shopping. Heartbroken Weeda keeps silence about it. After shopping, Hukum takes Sanjha to lunch where Hukum makes her realise the true love of Weeda. Sanjha is set free and runs to find Weeda. She hugs Weeda and ask him for forgiveness.

Cast
 Imran Aslam as Waheed Murad a.k.a. Weeda
 Suhaee Abro as Sanjha a.k.a Reshmi
 Fahad Mustafa as Dr. Ammar; Shabana's son
 Naila Jaffri as Shabana; Ammar's mother
 Sabreen Hisbani as Sarah a.k.a. Addi (Dead)
 Seemi Pasha as Shabo (Dead); Weeda and Deema's mother
 Malik Raza as Laeeq
 Shazia Afgan as Rosie (Dead)
 Salma Zafar as Shasta
 Resham as Mumtaz
 Noman Ijaz as Hukum
 Rehan Sheikh as Bakshu; Sara's husband
 Eshita Mehboob as Narmeen
 Ayeshah Alam as Fehmeeda; Hukum's wife
 Ayesha Toor as Aneeta
 Rashid Farooqui as Mehmood a.k.a. Muda
 Yasir Shooro as Badal
 Zuhab Khan as Deema
 Humaira Zaheer
 Maan Alina

Awards and nominations
 Hum Awards - Best Director Drama Serial - Farooq Rind
 Hum Awards - Best Television Sensation Female - Suhaee Abro

Nominations
 Lux Style Awards - Best Television Actor - Imran Aslam

References

2011 Pakistani television series debuts
Pakistani drama television series
Urdu-language television shows
Hum TV original programming
2012 Pakistani television series endings